"911" is a duet between Haitian rapper Wyclef Jean and American soul music singer Mary J. Blige. It was released on 5 September 2000 as the third single from Jean's second studio album, The Ecleftic: 2 Sides II a Book (2000), and was later included on Blige's compilation Reflections (A Retrospective) (2006). The song peaked at number 38 on the US Billboard Hot 100 and had success worldwide, particularly in Scandinavian countries, reaching number one in Norway and Sweden.

Music and video
The song depicted two star-crossed lovers in a web of drama with the male narrator running from police while the female narrator worries forlornly over him. The relationship is apparently under external pressures, as Jean sings "messing around with you is gonna get (the man) life", and later reflecting "it's worth the sacrifice".

Chart performances and awards
"911" was a hit for the two singers as it reached No. 38 on the Billboard Hot 100. The song was very successful in Sweden and in Norway where it reached number-one for almost two months. It earned a Platinum disc in Norway. It was also a top ten hit in Ireland, UK, Switzerland, Denmark, the Netherlands and Finland. It was nominated for a Grammy for Best R&B Vocal Performance by a duo or group in 2001.

Track listings

US 12-inch single
A1. "911" (Ghetto Love remix) – 4:01
A2. "911" (Ghetto Love remix instrumental) – 4:01
A3. "911" (Ghetto Love remix a cappella) – 4:01
B1. "911" (Emergency remix) – 4:23
B2. "911" (Emergency remix instrumental) – 4:23
B3. "911" (LP version) – 4:01

Australian CD single 1
 "911" (radio edit) – 4:06
 "911" (Ghetto Love remix) – 4:01
 "Younger Days" – 5:00
 "It Doesn't Matter" (remix featuring Hope) – 4:05

Australian CD single 2
 "911" (Emergency remix) – 4:23
 "911" (radio edit) – 4:06
 "911" (Ghetto Love remix) – 4:01
 "Younger Days" – 5:00
 "It Doesn't Matter" (remix featuring Hope) – 4:05

UK CD single
 "911" (LP version) – 4:21
 "Gone till November" – 3:29
 "It Doesn't Matter" – 4:05

UK cassette single
 "911" (LP version) – 4:21
 "911" (Ghetto Love remix) – 4:01

European CD single
 "911" (LP version) – 4:21
 "911" (Ghetto Love remix) – 4:01
 "911" (Emergency remix) – 4:23

French CD single
 "911" (radio edit) – 4:06
 "911" (Ghetto Love remix) – 4:01

Credits and personnel
Credits and personnel are taken from The Ecleftic: 2 Sides II a Book album booklet.

Studios
 Recorded and mixed at The Hit Factory (New York City)
 Mastered at Sterling Sound (New York City)

Personnel

 Wyclef Jean – writing, vocals, production
 Jerry "Wonder" Duplessis – writing, production
 Katia Cadet – writing
 Mary Brown – writing, background arrangements
 Mary J. Blige – featured vocals
 MB² – backing vocals
 Sedeck – co-production
 Andy Grassi – mixing, recording engineer, mastering
 Michael McCoy – recording engineer
 Chris Gehringer – mastering
 Serge "Sergical" Tsai – mastering

Charts

Weekly charts

Year-end charts

Certifications

Release history

References

Wyclef Jean songs
Mary J. Blige songs
2000 singles
2000 songs
Columbia Records singles
Male–female vocal duets
Music videos directed by Marcus Raboy
Number-one singles in Norway
Number-one singles in Sweden
Song recordings produced by Jerry Duplessis
Song recordings produced by Wyclef Jean
Songs written by Jerry Duplessis
Songs written by Wyclef Jean